is a private university in Aoba-ku, Sendai, Miyagi Prefecture, Japan. The  was established in 1949, based on the Tohoku Pharmaceutical College, which was established in 1939. In 1959, it became the first cancer research institute established at a private pharmaceutical university in Japan. In 1962 it became the first graduate school at the private pharmacy college. With the establishment of a Medical Department in 2015, the university became .

References

External links

 Official website 

Educational institutions established in 1939
Private universities and colleges in Japan
Universities and colleges in Miyagi Prefecture
1939 establishments in Japan
Medical schools in Japan
Buildings and structures in Sendai